Charles J. Starnes (April 26, 1912 – November 25, 1993) was a postal historian and writer of philatelic articles.

Philatelic activity
Starnes created significant collections of postal history, with emphasis on covers as opposed to postage stamps. He was particularly interested in foreign mail usage. His impressive and important collection of postal history of United States Department stamps was stolen and never recovered.

Philatelic literature
In 1982, Starnes published United States Letter Rates to Foreign Destinations, 1847 to GPU-UPU, which he later revised and updated in 1989. He was one of the editors of the Chronicle of the U.S. Classic Postal Issues, and was responsible for the Foreign Mails Section.

Honors and awards
Charles Starnes was named to the American Philatelic Society Hall of Fame in 1995. He received the Luff Award for Distinguished Philatelic Research in 1986.

See also
 Philately
 Philatelic literature

References
 Charles J. Starnes

1912 births
1993 deaths
Philatelic literature
American philatelists
Writers from Michigan
American Philatelic Society